Wolfgang Amadeus Mozart's Piano Concerto No. 12 in A major, K. 414 (385p), was written in the autumn of 1782 in Vienna. It is scored for solo piano (or harpsichord), two oboes, two bassoons (optional), two horns, and strings (consisting of violins, violas, cellos, and double basses). Like all three of the early Vienna concertos that Mozart wrote, it is a modest work that can be performed with only string quartet and keyboard (i.e., "a quattro"). As per 18th century performance practice a string orchestra could also have served as a suitable option for the "quattro" accompaniment.

The concerto has three movements:
Allegro in A major
Andante in D major
Allegretto in A major

It was the first of a set of three keyboard concertos (with K. 413 and 415) that Mozart performed at his Lenten concerts in 1783. The concert rondo in A, K. 386, has often been discussed as an alternative finale to the work; however, K. 386 cannot be performed a quattro, and autograph evidence shows that the current finale starts on the same sheet as the end of the slow movement.

Despite the modest nature and scoring of this concerto, it stands out in Mozart's early production. Although the three early Viennese concertos (Nos 11, 12 and 13) represent in some senses a formal regression compared to their immediate predecessors, especially No. 9 in E-flat major, this concerto is a forerunner of the mature works in terms of its musical effect.

The second movement is notable for its quotation of a theme from the overture to La calamita de' cuori by Johann Christian Bach, Mozart's former mentor in London, who had just died on 1 January 1782. In view of the fact that at this point Mozart also wrote back to his father concerning Bach's death, saying of it 'what a loss to the musical world!', it may also be regarded the moving Andante as a musical epitaph by the younger man for the old master.

Notes

References
Girdlestone, C. M. Mozart's piano concertos. Cassell, London.
Hutchings, A. A Companion to Mozart's Piano Concertos, Oxford University Press.
Mozart, W. A. Piano Concertos Nos. 11–16 in full score. Dover Publications, New York.

External links

12
1782 compositions
Compositions in A major